Edmund Lincoln Anderson (September 18, 1905 – February 28, 1977) was an American comedian and actor. To a generation of early radio and television comedy he was known as "Rochester".

Anderson entered show business as a teenager on the vaudeville circuit. In the early 1930s, he transitioned into films and radio. In 1937, he began his role of Rochester van Jones, usually known simply as "Rochester", the valet of Jack Benny, on his NBC radio show The Jack Benny Program. Anderson became the first African American to have a regular role on a nationwide radio program. When the series moved to CBS television in 1950, Anderson continued in the role until the series ended in 1965.

After the series ended, Anderson remained active with guest starring roles on television and voice work in animated series. He was also an avid horse-racing fan who owned several race horses and worked as a horse trainer at the Hollywood Park Racetrack. He was married twice and had four children. He died of heart disease in February 1977 at the age of 71.

Early life
Anderson was born in Oakland, California. His father, "Big Ed" Anderson, was a minstrel performer, while his mother, Ella Mae, had been a tightrope walker until her career was ended by a fall. He described himself as being a descendant of slaves who were able to leave the South during the Civil War through the Underground Railroad. At the age of ten, Anderson and his family moved from Oakland to San Francisco.  He left school when he was 14 to work as an errand boy to help his family.

Stage-struck at an early age, he spent much of his free time waiting at stage doors and cutting up on street corners with his friend and brother, Cornelius. Anderson briefly tried being a jockey, but had to give it up when he became too heavy. Anderson started in show business as part of an all African American revue at age 14; he had previously won an amateur contest at a vaudeville theater in San Francisco. Anderson joined the cast of Struttin' Along in 1923 and was part of Steppin' High both as a dancer and as one of the "Three Black Aces" with his brother, Cornelius, in 1924. He later worked in vaudeville with Cornelius. Anderson began adding comedy to his song and dance act in 1926.  During one of his vaudeville tours to the East Coast, Anderson first met Jack Benny; the men only exchanged greetings and shook hands.

Anderson's vocal cords were ruptured when he was a youngster selling newspapers in San Francisco. The newsboys believed those who were able to shout the loudest sold the most papers. The permanent damage to his vocal cords left him with the gravelly voice later familiar to both radio listeners and television viewers. Anderson was also a dancer and gained his show business start in this way, but it was his uniquely recognizable voice that brought him to stardom.

Career

The Jack Benny Program

Anderson's first appearance on The Jack Benny Program was on March 28, 1937. He was originally hired to play the one-time role of a redcap on the Benny program for a storyline of the show traveling from Chicago to California by train, which coincided with the radio show's actual return to NBC's Radio City West in Hollywood after a brief stint in New York. As Jack Benny and his show staff were traveling to California by train, Benny and his writers had an idea for a comedy sketch that took place on a train with a train porter getting the better of Benny on a fictional trip from Chicago to Los Angeles.  Benny liked the idea of the sketch enough to wire California to find someone for the role of the train porter before the show script was actually finished.  Benny's first choice for the role was Oscar, the shoeshine man on the Paramount studios lot. Oscar's agent told the Benny show his client would take the job for $300.  Benny thought this was too much money and the role went to Eddie Anderson. Anderson, who was working as a comedian in the Los Angeles Central Avenue district at the time, won the role after an audition.

When Benny and cast were preparing to board the train, Anderson and Benny had their first lines together, with the following exchange:
Benny: "Hey Redcap, carry my grips a little higher; there are some things hanging out."
Anderson: "Yes, sir."
Benny: "Just drop the grips down here until I get my crowd together."
Anderson: "Yes, Mr. Bunny."
Benny: "The name's Benny."
Anderson: "Well, this is Easter."
There was a recurring gag wherein Benny's inquiries about their arrival in Albuquerque were met with skepticism by Anderson that such a place existed.

Five weeks after Anderson's first appearance on the Benny program, he was called for another radio role on the show, this time as a waiter in a restaurant serving the cast. In the sketch, Benny complimented Anderson on his extensive knowledge, to which Anderson replied, "I don't know where Albuquerque is". During this appearance, Anderson made himself at home on the program, joining in the Jell-O commercial with the regulars of the cast. A few weeks later, Anderson was called back once more, now for the part of a "colored fellow" who had a financial disagreement with Benny.

The Benny show received a large amount of mail about Anderson's appearances on the radio program. Benny decided to make him part of the cast as his butler and valet, Rochester van Jones. Neither Benny nor Anderson could recall how they came up with the name of Rochester for Anderson's character. Anderson always credited Benny for the invention of the Rochester van Jones name, saying that the name was copyrighted and that Benny later sold the rights to him for a dollar. When Anderson became a regular member of the Benny show cast, he became the first African American to have a regular role on a nationwide radio program. Anderson first appeared as "Rochester" on the Benny program of June 20, 1937.

Subsequent episodes gave different "origin stories" for Rochester. One radio show guest starred Amos 'n' Andy, where the skit showed that Rochester used to work for them as a taxi cab driver. Benny and Rochester collide their cars, in which Benny is clearly at fault (as Rochester's car was way up on a grease rack). Benny claimed it was Rochester's fault and threatens to sue. The racial inequality of the respective parties is explicitly referenced, and Amos 'n' Andy essentially give Rochester to Benny to settle the matter out of court. (This same episode included Mary Livingstone's infamous blooper at the very end of the show – mispronouncing "grease rack" as "grass reek".) A later television show explained that Benny met Rochester when the latter was a porter on a railroad train; Benny is responsible for Rochester being fired and then hires him as a valet to make it up to him.

Benny's chief problem with Anderson was his frequently being late for the show. Benny attempted to instill punctuality in Anderson by fining him $50 each time he arrived late at the studio.  Anderson had a habit of losing track of time, especially when he was talking with someone. Benny enlisted some of the cast members to drop in on him just before travel dates to make sure he would be ready to go on time. Most of the time he was not, and there were times the other cast members would need to leave without Anderson with them.

On one occasion when the entire Benny show was scheduled to appear in New York, Anderson, who had been out late the night before departure day, could not be roused by Mamie on time. The Andersons arrived at the Los Angeles train station just as the Super Chief pulled out with the rest of the radio program's cast on it. Breaking the speed limit with an LAPD motorcycle squad escort, Anderson arrived at the Pasadena train station in time to catch his train from there.

Popularity
The Rochester character became immensely popular. In 1940, Anderson was invited to a Harvard University smoker but was detained by students from rival Massachusetts Institute of Technology. The comedian was met at the airport by MIT students who claimed they were on the Harvard committee. When it was discovered why Anderson was late to the Harvard gathering, a riot broke out as students from the two schools began fighting over the incident. Especially after World War II Rochester was second only to Benny himself in popularity and almost always received the most enthusiastic applause on his entrances and exits. Although he usually did not appear in the opening minutes of the shows, he began to surpass Mary Livingstone as Jack Benny's main foil, especially as Livingstone began to appear less frequently due to stage fright.

In January 1949, when The Jack Benny Program moved to the CBS Radio Network, Rochester's popularity was explicitly referenced on the first show, when Benny ran into his new CBS co-workers Amos and Andy during his first visit to the studio:

Amos: That Mr. Benny is supposed to be a big comedian.... He didn't say nothin' funny.

Andy: Well, Amos, it's just like I told ya', he ain't nothin' without Rochester.

– Laughter and applause –

Jack Benny and Rochester had numerous running gags, often based on Rochester's attempts to evade work, desire to go to Central Avenue to drink, and Benny's business ventures, or sidelines (selling sandwiches, running a laundry service, etc.). In his early appearances (late 1930s-early 1940s), a running gag also involved Rochester's gambling habits, although this aspect of his character was toned down considerably after World War II. Stories also often involved Benny's trademark cheapness: Rochester comments that he had to buy a toothbrush "on the installment plan", and in the same episode tells an IRS agent how his pay is calculated:Mr. Benny pays me so much a month, and then he points out the deductions: so much for insurance, so much for Social Security, an' what's left over is what they call "take-home pay" ... Then he points out that I'm livin' in HIS home, so he takes it!

Mayor of Central Avenue

While Anderson was born and raised in the Oakland area, he came to the Los Angeles African "Colored" American community in the 1930s in search of work in films. At the time of his success on the Benny radio show, the community thought of him as one of their own and was proud of his rise to stardom. The reality of an African American mayor of Los Angeles would not come in this era; for many years, those living in the Central Avenue area had held mock elections, with the winner being known as "the Mayor of Central Avenue". The title holder had both the right and the duty to speak up about issues affecting the local African American community. California Eagle readers opened their newspapers on May 23, 1940, to find Eddie "Rochester" Anderson asking for their votes for Mayor of Central Avenue.

From his headquarters at the Dunbar Hotel, Anderson conducted his campaign mainly based on real issues, one of them being a need for African Americans to serve their country as aviators. He was deeply committed to this issue, taking flying lessons and lecturing with a Tuskegee Institute representative about this need. After Anderson announced his run for mayor, President Franklin D. Roosevelt also addressed the aviation issue, asking that the nation commit itself to building an air force. On Election Day, Anderson won the right to claim the title.

Progression of race relations
Anderson's role as a servant was common for black performers of that era, such as Ethel Waters in Beulah. The stereotyping of black characters was a standard practice in the entertainment business for generations, referencing minstrel shows, where white actors in blackface reinforced low stereotypes of laziness, ignorance, illiteracy, weakness for drinking, gambling, and carousing, and general unfitness for any position of responsibility. Jack Benny's broadcast on November 1, 1936, was entitled Doc Benny's Minstrel Show, in which the entire cast performed a minstrel show in a "black" dialect. They redid Doc Benny's Minstrel Show on March 3, 1942; the subsequent performance demonstrates the progression of race relations.

According to Jack Benny's posthumous autobiography, Sunday Nights at Seven, the tone of racial humor surrounding Rochester declined following World War II, once the enormity of The Holocaust was revealed. After the war, Benny and his writers made a conscious effort to remove all stereotypical aspects from the Rochester character. The changing times became very apparent in February 1950, when a 1940 script was re-used on The Jack Benny Program. The script included several African American stereotypes—for example, a reference to Rochester carrying a razor—and prompted some listeners, who were unaware the script was reused, to send in angry letters protesting the stereotypes. Thereafter, Benny insisted that his writers guarantee that no racial jokes or references should be heard on his show. Benny often gave key guest-star appearances to African American performers such as Louis Armstrong and The Ink Spots, and Benny himself made numerous personal appeals on his show, asking listeners to reject racism in favor of fraternity and peaceful relations between all races of the world.

The relationship between Rochester and Benny became more complex and familiar as the popularity of Rochester's character grew, with Rochester's role becoming both less stereotypical (in early episodes he carried a switchblade) and less subservient (though he remained a butler). As a butler he was subservient to the entire cast and was addressed as Rochester, but addressed the other characters as Mr. and Miss. Although Dennis Day's character is much younger and an idiot, Rochester respectfully addressed him as Mr. Day. Rochester often outwitted Benny, by getting Benny to mop the floor, for example.

The "Rochester" character retained many of the stereotypes (lazy, gambler, drinker), but they became a part of his character, disassociated from his race. Even though some of the humor was stereotypical, it was always done so that the racial element of the joke came from Anderson and no one else. In a February 1940 multi-episode radio play in which the gang visits Yosemite National Park, Rochester bemoans about having to constantly sing songs for Jack (in order to make up for the lack of a radio in their car). Worse still, he says, "at eight o'clock he wants me to imitate 'Amos and Andy'". After a pause for audience laughter, he continues: "I can't do that blackface stuff!" Later, Rochester asks Benny if he can walk around and explore at Badger Pass. Jack consents, but warns Rochester not to "get lost in the snow", to which Rochester replies, "Who me?".

During World War II, Benny toured with his show, but Rochester did not, because discrimination in the armed forces would have required separate living quarters. However, during performances of the radio program staged before armed forces audiences at bases and military hospitals, the appearance of Rochester routinely drew enthusiastic applause that arguably often outstripped that received by other members of the cast, more so than in civilian audiences.  Also referenced in Benny's posthumous autobiography, Sunday Nights at Seven, was an episode at the conclusion of a broadcast originating at a military base which featured Rochester.  Benny was reportedly at a table mingling with soldiers, when one serviceman told Benny how he thought Rochester was really funny and one of his favorites. Benny asked if he would like to meet him, but the soldier declined saying that where he comes from whites don't sit with people like Rochester.  Appalled, Benny reportedly told him off and left the table.

In 1943, when Benny brought his entire radio show cast to Canada at his own expense to perform for those in the various branches of the Canadian services, Anderson and his wife received a warm welcome. Stateside, an incident was defused by Benny when, according to reporter Fredric W. Slater, Anderson was denied a room at the hotel where Benny and his staff were planning to stay in Saint Joseph, Missouri. When it was announced that Anderson could not stay there, Benny replied: "If he doesn't stay here, neither do I." The hotel allowed Anderson to remain as a guest.

It was not the only time a hotel refused Anderson a room. Soon after he became part of the permanent show cast, the program went on location to New York. When a couple from the South complained about staying in the same hotel as Anderson, the hotel manager tried to get him to find a room somewhere else. Hilliard Marks, the show's producer and also Jack Benny's brother-in-law, told the manager that Anderson would leave the hotel the next day. When he did, Jack Benny and the entire radio show cast and crew totaling 44 people, joined Anderson in checking out of the hotel.

Among the most highly paid performers of his time, Anderson invested wisely and became wealthy. Until the 1950s, Anderson was the highest paid African American actor, receiving an annual salary of $100,000. In 1962, Anderson was on Ebony magazine's list of the 100 wealthiest African Americans. Despite this, he was so strongly identified with the "Rochester" role that many listeners of the radio program mistakenly persisted in the belief that he was Benny's actual valet. One such listener, after hearing Rochester's jokes about his low salary, drove Benny to distraction when he sent him a scolding letter concerning Rochester's alleged pay, and then sent another letter to Anderson, which urged him to sue Benny. In reality, Anderson did well enough to have his own valet.

The fact that Anderson was frequently seen at Benny's home may have helped perpetuate the idea that he was a valet to Benny. Benny held the first rehearsal of his weekly radio show at his home in Beverly Hills. Those riding the stars' homes tour buses in the morning often saw Anderson sitting on Benny's front steps, drinking from a quart of milk while waving and calling "Yoo Hoo!" to those on the tour bus. Anderson would not start rehearsal until after Benny's milkman arrived with some of his breakfast.

When Benny brought his show to television in 1950, Anderson as Rochester remained part of the cast until the television show left the air after the 1964–1965 season.
 In 1953, Anderson appeared as Rochester in an episode of The Milton Berle Show with the storyline being that Berle wanted to hire him away from Benny. He appeared on an episode of Bachelor Father in 1962 again as Rochester, where the story was that the Gregg household had borrowed him, hoping some of the thrifty habits he learned working for Benny might cut their own expenses.

The high esteem in which Anderson and Benny held each other was evident. During a February 1958 taping of a Shower of Stars special which was to celebrate Benny's "40th birthday", Anderson suffered a mild heart attack. A Life magazine photo taken at the rehearsal after Anderson was taken to the hospital, shows a concerned Benny, whose thoughts were not about the television show, but about his friend. After the television show went off the air, it was four years before the two men worked together again. Though Benny was frequently working out of town during that time, he and Anderson still kept in touch; Anderson said, "We always exchange Christmas gifts and he's not as stingy as he pretends to be."

On the 1968 special Jack Benny's Bag, Benny introduced Anderson as "my lifelong friend, Rochester" and asked Anderson to work with him on a new television series. The plots brought up by Benny were of recent or current television shows, with Anderson reminding him that this had already been done. Benny then asked Anderson about coming back to work for him as his valet. Anderson replied, "Hold it, Blue Eyes, we don't do that any more." The following year, Rochester appeared again in the special Jack Benny's New Look, where Rochester drives Benny home in a Rolls-Royce after Benny's meeting with Gregory Peck to discuss appearing as a guest star.

Benny:  "Well Rochester, congratulate me. Gregory Peck said that he would be on my show"

Rochester:  "Good, good. I'll bet you had to pay him a lot of money"

Benny:  "You're wrong. He's going to do the show for nothing".

Rochester:  "How did you do that?"

Benny:  "Because I'm a very good salesman. I didn't come right out and ask him.  I was very subtle"

Rochester:  "What did you do? Did you cut your wrist?"

At the conclusion of the trip, Benny remarks "Thanks for the ride, Rochester.  And oh by the way, you have a beautiful car!"

Upon Benny's death in 1974, a tearful Anderson, interviewed for television, spoke of Benny with admiration and respect.

Films
Anderson's film career began with George Cukor's What Price Hollywood? (1932), as a butler to one of the lead characters, and appeared in dozens of Hollywood films through the 1930s and 1940s. Anderson appeared on screen with radio boss Jack Benny for the first time in the film Man About Town (1939). The duo appeared in a few other feature films, including Buck Benny Rides Again (1940).

In addition to his role with Benny, Anderson appeared in over sixty motion pictures, including The Green Pastures (1936) as Noah, Jezebel (1938) as Gros Bat, Capra's You Can't Take It with You (1938) as Donald, and in Gone with the Wind (1939) as Uncle Peter, among many others. He reprised his 'Rochester' role in Topper Returns (1941), this time as Cosmo Topper's valet (though he jokes about Mr. Benny in the film). He had a rare lead role in the all-star black Hollywood musical, Vincente Minnelli's debut film, Cabin in the Sky (1943),  as Joseph 'Little Joe' Jackson. The film Brewster's Millions (1945) in which Anderson was one of the stars, was banned in some Southern areas. The Memphis Board of Motion Picture Censors banned the film from being shown there, saying about Anderson, "(he) has an important role and has too familiar a way about him.", and about the film itself, "(it) presents too much social equality and racial mixture."

Anderson, Benny, and the remaining cast members of The Jack Benny Program (Mary Livingstone, Don Wilson, and Mel Blanc) also provided their voices to the Warner Bros. cartoon The Mouse that Jack Built (1959), directed by Robert McKimson. This cartoon portrays rodent versions of the show's characters. The real Jack Benny appears as himself at the end. Anderson's last significant feature film performance was as one of the taxi drivers in Stanley Kramer's comedy, It's a Mad, Mad, Mad, Mad World (1963), in which Benny made a cameo appearance (though they did not appear together). Anderson was elected into the Black Filmmakers Hall of Fame in 1975.

Other performances
Anderson appeared as a mystery guest on the television game show What's My Line? in 1952.  Since the panel was blindfolded, Dorothy Kilgallen's question, "Are you brunette?", brought a roar of laughter from the audience; Anderson laughed so hard he was not able to reply to the question. In 1957, Hallmark Hall of Fame presented The Green Pastures, giving Anderson the chance to reprise his film role as Noah on television; the program was nominated for an Emmy Award.

Anderson also appeared on episodes of The Dick Powell Show, It Takes a Thief, and Love, American Style. In the early 1970s, Anderson was the voice of cartoon character Bobby Joe Mason in Harlem Globe Trotters and The New Scooby-Doo Movies. By 1972, he attempted a comeback with a nightclub act in Houston which led to being cast in Broadway revival of Good News, but was forced to resign due to bad health.

Other business ventures
Though Anderson had roles in films such as The Green Pastures and was a dancer at the Cotton Club in Culver City, California, when he first came to Hollywood, his real success did not arrive until he became a regular on The Jack Benny Program.  Not long after he became a regular cast member on the Benny show, Anderson opened a nightclub in the Central Avenue section of Los Angeles.  Anderson's nightclub was short-lived because he was too generous with his friends.  The club was picking up the tab for too many guests and Anderson was forced to close the nightclub not long after it opened.

During World War II, Anderson was the owner of the Pacific Parachute Company, an African American owned and operated business that made parachutes for the Army and Navy.
 He also managed a boxer, Billy Metcalfe, in the 1940s.

Anderson had an astute business sense; in 1948, he saw the value and potential of Las Vegas as an entertainment center. With the idea of building and operating a hotel and casino there where African Americans would be welcome, he asked for investors to join him in the venture. Anderson failed to attract enough people willing to invest, and he was unable to complete the plan. When the Moulin Rouge Hotel, an integrated hotel and casino, opened in 1955, Anderson was brought in for its opening. He expressed regret at the thought that the hotel might have been his if he had the further financial backing.

Personal life

Marriages and children
On May 2, 1939, Anderson married Mamie (née Wiggins) Nelson. She was the daughter of Alonzo and Annie Wiggins of Eastman, Georgia. Mamie died on August 5, 1954, at the age of 43, following a two-year battle with cancer. At the time of her death, she and Anderson had been married for 15 years and her son Billy (Anderson's stepson) was playing professional football for the Chicago Bears. Billy was born George Billy Nelson to Mamie Wiggins and her previous husband on March 8, 1929, in Los Angeles. When Mamie married Eddie Anderson, Billy was adopted and took the surname Anderson.

Following Mamie's death, Anderson married Evangela "Eva" Simon on February 8, 1956, at Kingman, Arizona. The couple had three children: daughters Stephanie and Evangela Jr. ("Eva"), and son Edmund Jr. Simon and Anderson divorced in 1973 with Anderson retaining custody of his minor son and daughter.

Home

Like many African Americans in the entertainment industry, Anderson made his home in the West Adams district of Los Angeles.  In previous times, the district had been home to doctors, lawyers, and railroad barons. In the Depression era, the area had fallen into hard times, with many residents needing to either sell their homes or rent out rooms in them. By the 1940s, the African American entertainment community began purchasing homes in the district, nicknaming it "Sugar Hill". Some property owners reacted to their new neighbors by adding restrictive covenants to their deeds. The covenants either prohibited African Americans from purchasing a property or inhabiting it once purchased. The practice was declared illegal by the U.S. Supreme Court in 1948.

Since Anderson wanted to build a home designed by Paul Williams, he was limited in his choice of a site for it by these restrictive covenants. As a result, his large and luxurious home with a swimming pool where the neighborhood children were always welcome, stands in an area of smaller, bungalow-style homes. The street was renamed because "Rochester" lived on it.

Hobbies
Anderson built model airplanes and racing cars, but also designed a life-size sports car for himself in 1951.  Anderson combined a Cadillac engine under the hood and a sleek, low-slung exterior to create a car he both drove and exhibited at various sports car shows throughout the country.

Anderson, who was the skipper of his own cabin cruiser, was missing and feared lost at sea in February 1946.  When the boat developed engine trouble, Anderson and his two friends did everything sailors are expected to do to signal an SOS. They used mirrors, built fires, used lanterns and flew the ship's flag upside-down to indicate they were in distress.  They spent the night adrift until a fishing boat finally spotted them and towed them into Los Angeles harbor. Anderson did not realize he had caused great concern until he heard a news story on the radio that described the search for him as still continuing. On the following Sunday, Anderson was back on the "Lucky Strike Program," and joked with Jack Benny about the incident. ("That's the first time I ever had a 'lost weekend' on nothing but water!")

Horse racing

Anderson was the owner of racehorses. The best known of them was Burnt Cork, a Thoroughbred that ran in the 1943 Kentucky Derby, making him the first African American owner of a horse entered into the Derby. Having been given the following day off by Benny, Anderson and his wife, Mamie, traveled to Louisville, Kentucky to see their horse run in the Derby. Since segregation in public accommodations was practiced there, the Andersons were invited to be guests at the home of Mae Street Kidd, an African American Kentucky politician.

Both before and after the race, Anderson was accused of entering his horse in the race strictly for publicity purposes for himself, especially after Burnt Cork finished last. Those making the statements believed this tarnished the name and history of the race. Jack Cuddy, a United Press International sports columnist, pointed out in his column that around the same time Burnt Cork ran last for Anderson, King George VI's horse, Tipstaff, finished last at Ascot without any of the comments that surrounded Anderson.

When Burnt Cork won an important race, Anderson came to Metro-Goldwyn-Mayer for work dressed as a Kentucky colonel; he also insisted on being called "Colonel Rochester".

After the Benny television show had left the air, Anderson turned back to his love of horses and racing, working as a trainer at the Hollywood Park Racetrack until shortly before his death. He acquired much of his knowledge when one of his racing horses, Up and Over, was injured in a fall; it was suggested that the horse be euthanized due to the extent of those injuries. Anderson refused this and said he would take care of his injured animal. He spent extensive periods of time at the Paramount Pictures studio library, reading everything in their collection on equine anatomy.  This led Anderson to a veterinary surgeon who was interested in helping Up and Over; together the two men got the thoroughbred back on his feet again.

Death
Anderson died of heart disease on February 28, 1977, at the Motion Picture & Television Country House and Hospital in Los Angeles, California. He was buried in Los Angeles in historic Evergreen Cemetery, the oldest existing cemetery in the city.

Legacy
In a last philanthropic gesture, he willed his sizable home to be used to help reform substance abusers. Three decades after his death, The Eddie Rochester Anderson Foundation in Los Angeles ("The Rochester House") helps troubled men transition into society and is an at-risk substance sober-living residence for homeless substance abusers. The Rochester House opened its doors at several neighboring properties in 1989, and is dedicated in memory of Eddie Anderson.

Anderson's son, Eddie Jr., later established The Eddie "Rochester" Anderson Foundation.

For his contribution to the radio industry, Eddie Anderson has a star on the Hollywood Walk of Fame for Radio, at 6513 Hollywood Blvd, in Hollywood. In 2001, Anderson was posthumously inducted into the Radio Hall of Fame.

Filmography

Footnotes

Works cited

External links

 
 
 
 

1905 births
1977 deaths
20th-century American male actors
African-American male comedians
American male comedians
African-American male dancers
African-American dancers
American male dancers
American male film actors
American racehorse owners and breeders
American male radio actors
American male voice actors
Burials at Evergreen Cemetery, Los Angeles
Male actors from Oakland, California
Vaudeville performers
People from San Bruno, California
Apollo Records artists
African-American male actors
American male television actors
Comedians from Los Angeles County
People from West Adams, Los Angeles
20th-century American comedians
20th-century American dancers
20th-century African-American sportspeople